College Park is the eighth studio album by American rapper Logic, released on February 24, 2023, by BobbyBoy Records, Three Oh One Productions, and BMG. The album marks Logic's first release as an independent artist, following a 10-year stint with Def Jam. It features guest appearances by Adé, Andy Hull, Big Lenbo, Bun B, C Dot Castro, Fat Trel, Jordan Harris, Lil Keke, Lucy Rose, Norah Jones, RZA, Redman, Joey Badass, Seth MacFarlane, and Statik Selektah.

Background
Logic first teased the album in October 2021 in an Instagram story. The album's title was referenced several times in Logic's 2022 album Vinyl Days. College Park was officially announced on January 10, 2023, set to be his first release since parting ways with Def Jam after releasing seven studio albums with the label. In the past, he had expressed his frustration with the label: "I think for me, I've had a relationship that's been very up and down, but it's been a lot of ups, it really has. I can't sit here and just go in on Def Jam, when it's not Def Jam, it's major labels in general," he told Apple Music.

In a video posted on Logic's YouTube channel, Logic told fans, "I love y'all and I'm making shit from the heart. I'm loving hip-hop. I was not really feeling it for a while. I don't really mean the music, I just mean the bullshit of the industry. But I realize now more than ever that none of that shit matters. I've missed you guys and I'm here and I just want to have fun and I'm so excited for College Park."

Certifications 
In the United States, College Park debuted on number 21 on the Billboard 200, selling 17,884 copies in its first week.

Track listing

Personnel
Musicians

 Logic – vocals (all tracks), electric guitar (track 13)
 Josh Lippi – bass guitar (1–9, 12, 13, 16), electric guitar (3, 4, 8)
 Steve Wyreman – electric guitar (1, 6, 12)
 Kevin Randolph – synthesizer (1–6, 12), Rhodes piano (2–9, 13, 16), keyboards (2), Mellotron (4, 5, 9, 12), piano (5, 17), organ (12)
 RZA – vocals (1)
 Chris Thornton – backing vocals (2–5, 8, 16, 17)
 Lucy Rose – backing vocals (2–5, 8, 12, 16, 17)
 Pete Jacobson – cello (2, 4, 5, 8, 9, 12, 16, 17)
 Tom Lea – viola, violin (2, 4, 5, 8, 9, 12, 16, 17)
 Juicy J – additional vocals (3)
 Greg Somerville – backing vocals (3)
 C Dot Castro – vocals (3, 7, 15)
 Travis Stacey – electric guitar (5)
 Stuart D. Bogie – saxophone (5, 8, 13, 16, 17), flute (13)
 Josh "Rookie" – additional vocals (6)
 Chukwudi Hodge – drums (6)
 Arkae Tuazon – keyboards (6)
 Andy Hull – vocals (6)
 Adé – vocals (7)
 Big Lenbo – vocals (7, 15)
 Fat Trel – vocals (7)
 6ix – electric guitar (9, 13), sound effects (11), acoustic guitar (14), bass guitar (14)
 Statik Selektah – scratching, vocals (9)
 Redman – vocals (9)
 Seth MacFarlane – vocals (9)
 Joey Badass – vocals (10)
 Norah Jones – celeste piano, piano (11)
 Jordan Harris – vocals, backing vocals (12)
 Lil' Keke – vocals (12, 16)
 Bun B – vocals (16)

Technical
 Dave Kutch – mastering 
 Bobby Campbell – mixing (all tracks), engineering (1, 6, 7, 11, 13)
 PSTMN – engineering (1–6, 8–10, 12, 14, 15), engineering assistance (7)
 Reed Seely – engineering (2–5, 8–10, 12, 16, 17)
 Nich Jones – engineering assistance (2–5, 8–10, 12, 16, 17)
 Josh Kay – engineering assistance (11)

Charts

References

2023 albums
Logic (rapper) albums
Self-released albums